Arson in royal dockyards was a criminal offence in the United Kingdom and the British Empire. It was among the last offences that were punishable by execution in the United Kingdom. The crime was created by the Dockyards etc. Protection Act 1772 (12 Geo. 3 c.24) passed by the Parliament of Great Britain and was designed to protect Royal Dockyards and vessels from arson attacks.

It remained one of the few capital offences after reform of the death penalty in 1861, and remained in effect even after the death penalty was permanently abolished for murder in 1969. However, it was then eliminated by the Criminal Damage Act 1971.

Passage 
The Dockyards etc. Protection Act 1772 was passed in order to protect Royal Navy ships, dockyards, and stores from damage. At the time, ships were built of flammable oak wood and tar, and the naval yards were full of these supplies. Punishment for violating the act was a death sentence. The first section created the offence of arson in the royal dockyards by making it an offence to burn or destroy Royal Navy ships, stores, or ammunition under penalty of death anywhere in the British Empire. The Act also provided that benefit of clergy was not an available defence for the crime. The second section also stated that offenders could be tried if the offence occurred anywhere outside of the realm. The act put a version of arson in statute law for the first time, as all arson previously had been under common law. Scotland had its own similar offence of wilful fire raising.

At the time of the Act's passage, the death penalty was common; at the turn of the 19th century, 220 offences carried the death penalty. In 1861, Parliament passed the Offences against the Person Act 1861, as part of a series of criminal law consolidation acts, which sharply limited the death penalty to only five civilian crimes. These were: arson in royal dockyards, murder, treason, espionage, and piracy with violence.

Case of John the Painter 

Only one prosecution was brought under the Act. In that case, the Scottish saboteur John the Painter (also known as James Hill or John Aitken) was prosecuted and executed in 1777 for setting the rope house at Portsmouth Royal Dockyard on fire. He was hanged from the mizzenmast of the frigate , the highest gallows erected in British history, with the frigate moored at Portsmouth Royal Dockyards in view of the damage he had caused. A crowd of 20,000 gathered to witness the hanging.

Amendment and repeal 
The offence created by the 1772 act was included in the Judgment of Death Act 1823 among those for which the judge could record a death sentence while substituting a lesser one. It was among those for which the 1837 Punishment of Offences Bill, as introduced in the Commons by Lord John Russell, proposed to reduced the penalty from death to transportation. However, the House of Lords deleted this provision in committee on the ground that the offence was tantamount to treason. The short title "Dockyards etc. Protection Act 1772" was assigned by the Short Titles Act 1892 and again by the Short Titles Act 1896. The Children Act 1908 removed the death penalty for under-16s. The 1965 act temporarily abolishing the death penalty for murder was made permanent by Parliamentary resolution in 1969, leaving the provisions of the Dockyards etc. Protection Act 1772 as one of the few crimes that retained the death penalty.

In 1970, the Law Commission proposed that the crime of arson in royal dockyards be abolished in its draft Criminal Damage Bill as part of an update of the law on criminal damage. The reasoning was that the law was no longer required for its original purposes, as warships were no longer made of flammable materials. The resulting Criminal Damage Act received royal assent from Queen Elizabeth II in 1971 and the offence of arson in royal dockyards was abolished. In a speech in the House of Lords in 1998, Lord Goodhart stated that the dockyard arson offence disappeared from the list of capital crimes in 1971 "without, so far as I am aware, either comment or concern."

The Crime and Disorder Act 1998 and the Human Rights Act 1998 abolished the death penalty for all remaining crimes.

Despite abolition in the United Kingdom, a 2004 episode of the comedy quiz show QI asserted that it is still popularly and erroneously believed that arson in royal dockyards continues to exist as a capital offence. Though similar crimes have occurred since abolition, they are now dealt with under general laws relating to arson.

Applicability outside of the United Kingdom 
The offence defined in the act could be committed "either within this Realm, or in any of the Islands, Countries,  Forts, or Places thereunto belonging".

A 1975 report for the Australian state of Victoria found that the Dockyards etc. Protection Act 1772 was still apparently in force, as the sections of the UK's Criminal Damage Act 1971 that repealed the Dockyards Act explicitly applied only to the United Kingdom. However, the offence of arson in royal dockyards is considered obsolete in Victoria, as the provisions have been superseded by the state's Crimes Act 1958 and the federal Crimes Act 1914 as amended. New South Wales also retained it, as it was viewed as being ultra vires for the Parliament of New South Wales to amend it.

The British Overseas Territory of Gibraltar had the act incorporated into its law in the English Law (Application) Act 1962. Thus, the offence was retained in Gibraltarian law; however, section two was repealed in 1972.

The 1772 act was formally repealed in the law of the Republic of Ireland by the Statute Law Revision Act 2007, without implying that it had previously been in force. There was and is uncertainty over whether statutes made by the Parliament of Great Britain in 1772 would extend to the Kingdom of Ireland without Ireland being explicitly stated. The 1922 Constitution of the Irish Free State said earlier statutes would remain in force unless incompatible with its provisions; similarly the 1937 Constitution of Ireland.

References

Further reading 
 Text of the Act for the Better Securing of His Majesty's Dock Yards, Magazines, Ships, Ammunition, and Stores

Arson in the United Kingdom
English criminal law
Great Britain Acts of Parliament 1772

1971 disestablishments in the United Kingdom